San Cristóbal Island and named previously by the English as Chatham Island, is the easternmost island in the Galápagos archipelago, as well as one of the oldest geologically. It is administratively part of San Cristóbal Canton, Ecuador.

Its Spanish  (and official Ecuadorian) name "San Cristóbal" comes from the patron saint of seafarers, St. Christopher. English speakers increasingly use that name in preference to the traditional English name of Chatham Island, derived from William Pitt, 1st Earl of Chatham.

History 
San Cristobal Island is composed of three or four fused volcanoes, all extinct. It is home to the oldest permanent settlement of the islands and is the island where Darwin first went ashore in 1835. A small lake called El Junco is the only source of fresh water in the islands. The availability of fresh water is what led to the early settlement of San Cristobal. A penal colony was built on San Cristóbal Island in 1880 for prisoners from mainland Ecuador. This later turned into a military base for Ecuador and export center for the island's products including sugar, coffee, cassava, cattle, fish and lime.

In April 1888 , a Navy-crewed research vessel assigned to the United States Fish Commission, made landfall at an abandoned settlement on Charles Island.

Geography 
The population is approximately 6000. San Cristóbal is the most fertile island of the archipelago and is the second most populated after Santa Cruz. The capital of the archipelago, Puerto Baquerizo Moreno, lies at the south-western tip of the island.

Air transport 
The island is served by San Cristóbal Airport, with daily flights from Quito and Guayaquil.

Ecology 
This island hosts frigatebirds, Galápagos sea lions, Galápagos tortoises, blue and red footed boobies, tropicbirds, marine iguanas, dolphins and swallow-tailed gulls. It has been recognised as an Important Bird Area (IBA) by BirdLife International. Its vegetation includes Calandrinia galapagosa, Lecocarpus darwinii, trees such as Lignum vitae, Matazarna. In the waters nearby are sharks, rays, and lobsters.

The largest fresh water lake in the archipelago, Laguna El Junco, is located in a crater in the highlands of San Cristóbal, in the southern half of the island. The lake harbors a large population of birdlife, but reaching the lake requires a short uphill walk.  Nearby, La Galapaguera is a breeding station and sanctuary for giant tortoises.

Economy 
Most inhabitants of San Cristóbal Island make their living in government, tourism, and fishing. The majority of the residents of San Cristóbal live in the port city of Puerto Baquerizo Moreno, which is the capital of Ecuador′s Galápagos Province.  Island tourism sites nearer the town of Puerto Baquerizo Moreno include the Cerro Tijeretas, a nesting colony for frigate birds, and a statue of  Charles Darwin, marking the original site where he first disembarked in the Galápagos Islands during the second voyage of HMS Beagle on 16 September 1835.  La Loberia, a colony of sea lions, lies about ten minutes by bus from the town.

Local boat tours also take visitors to two popular nearby dive sites. "Kicker Rock" (the Spanish name is "León Dormido") is the remains of a lava cone, now split in two. Isla Lobos ("Sea Lion Island") is also a nesting site for blue-footed boobies.

Climate 
San Cristóbal Island has a tropical climate with warm, dry winters and hot, humid summers with more precipitation than in winter.

The following table shows the variation of precipitation in different places of Santa Cruz Island:

References 

Historical Ecology in the Galapagos Islands: I. A Holocene Pollen Record from El Junco Lake, Isla San Cristoba, by Paul A. Colinvaux, Eileen K. Schofield. The Journal of Ecology, Vol. 64, No. 3 (Nov., 1976), pp. 989–1012, .

External links 
San Cristóbal Island – galapagosonline.com

Islands of the Galápagos Islands
Volcanic crater lakes
Former penal colonies
Important Bird Areas of the Galápagos Islands
Seabird colonies